Sherwood is an unincorporated community located in Choctaw County, Mississippi, United States, along Mississippi Highway 15 and is approximately  south of Mathiston and  north of Reform.

References

Unincorporated communities in Choctaw County, Mississippi
Unincorporated communities in Mississippi